Flamurtari FC B is an Albanian football club based in the city of Vlorë. It's a B team of Flamurtari Vlorë. The team is currently not competing in the any football league.

References

Flamurtari B
Flamurtari B